Chrysoteuchia culmella, the garden grass-veneer, is a species of moth of the family Crambidae. It was first described by Carl Linnaeus in his 1758 10th edition of Systema Naturae. It is found in Europe.

The wingspan is 18–24 mm.
The forewings are brown ; a whitish median streak, ending in branches along veins 2-5, often separated by dark fuscous scales ; dorsal 2/3 often wholly suffused with whitish-ochreous ; a terminal series of black dots ; cilia metallic. Hindwings are rather dark grey. The larva is pale pinkish-ochreous ; spots brown ; head and plate of 2 brown, darker- marked.

The moth flies from June to July depending on the location.

The larvae feed on various grasses.

References

External links
 Chrysoteuchia culmella. UKMoths.

Crambini
Moths described in 1758
Taxa named by Carl Linnaeus
Moths of Europe